Swirly Termination is a compilation album by British band Ozric Tentacles. Though released in 2000 this record contains songs made as early as 1992. The reason for this is that the band had to deliver one more album to their record company, Snapper Music, before parting ways, and thus came up with some previously unreleased material.

This album was not promoted by the band in any way and, apart from the songs itself, they did not contribute to either the title nor the artwork.

Track listing
 "Steep" – 3:11
 "Space Out" – 8:29
 "Pyoing" – 4:30
 "Far Dreaming" – 5:25
 "Waldorfdub" – 6:14
 "Kick 98" – 6:03
 "Yoy Mandala" – 11:52

Personnel
 Ed Wynne - guitar, keyboards
 John Egan - flute, vocals
 Zia Geelani - bass
 Seaweed - keyboards
 Rad - drums, percussion
 Joie Hinton - keyboards

References

2000 albums
Ozric Tentacles albums